Foreshadow is a 2013 Australian supernatural mystery thriller film directed by Carmelo Musca and starring co-writer Justin Burford, Myles Pollard and Andrea Addison.

Plot synopsis
Jesse Milton is living the good life, surfing the big waves and meeting hot girls, until the mysterious death of a friend turns his everyday life upside down. With the cops unable to investigate the killing, Milton enlists the help of his friends to help identify a serial killer and finds himself battling demonic forces.

Cast
Justin Burford as Jesse Milton
Myles Pollard as Detective Michael Monaghan
Andrea Addison as Joanne Peterson
Ben Purser as Billy Jones
Ben Mortley as Luke Matthews
James Hagan as Father Bernard
Melanie Lyons as Tessa Mailáth
Ben Young as Ted

References

External links
Foreshadow on Internet Movie Database

2013 films
Australian supernatural films
Australian thriller films
2010s mystery thriller films
2010s English-language films
2010s Australian films